The 2011–12 Färjestad BK season is Färjestad's 37th and current season in the top tier Swedish league Elitserien (SEL). The regular season began on September 15, 2011 at home against Skellefteå AIK and is scheduled to end on March 6, 2012 on away ice against Frölunda HC. The 2011–12 season sees Färjestad attempting to defend their Swedish championship title from the previous season.

Summary
Färjestad was the only team in the league without a win in regulation time (60 minutes) after the first 11 games, having faced all teams in the league once. Färjestad were also located on the 12th and final spot with only 8 points in the standings at that time. This brought Niklas Czarnecki's head-coaching position for the club into question by many experts, although Czarnecki remained in the club at that time. In their 12th game of the season, where they met Frölunda on 15 October 2011 at Löfbergs Lila Arena, Färjestad took an inevitable 2–1 win in front of 7,566 spectators and also took their first regulation-time win of the season, advancing to the 11th spot in the standings. This began what would become a five-game winning streak, before losing 1–5 against HV71 at home ice on 29 October.

On 13 October 2011, new Färjestad forward Hannes Hyvönen received a match penalty when he illegally made a hit to the head of Per Hallin to the boards in a home game against Timrå. As a consequence, Hyvönen was suspended for three games and fined 14,000 SEK. Just two weeks later, on 29 October, Czech defenceman Martin Ševc also received a match penalty, was suspended for three games and had to pay an 18,000 SEK fine after making hate speech against HV71 defenceman Daniel Rahimi. One week later, Färjestad received their third suspension of the season when defenceman Sanny Lindström was suspended for two games and forced to pay a 20,000 SEK fine for hitting Modo player Janos Hari to the head on 5 November 2011.

After a three-game streak of losses between 7–14 January 2012, Färjestad dropped in the standings and fell closer to the line for playoff qualification. As a result, head coach Czarnecki was fired. One of the team's assistant coaches at that time, Leif Carlsson, took over. Andreas Johansson took over Carlsson's former position as one of the assistant coaches.

Färjestad finished 6th in the regular season and were facing 3rd-seeded HV71 in the quarterfinals. Färjestad came out on top in six games and advanced to the semifinals, where they are playing against 4th-seeded Brynäs IF

Regular season

Standings

Game log

Playoffs

Game log

Transactions

Roster
Updated February 14, 2012.

References

External links
Farjestadsbk.se — Official team website
Hockeyligan.se — Official league website
Swehockey.se — Official statistics website

2011-12
2011–12 Elitserien season